Flanker may refer to:

 Flanker (perfume), a newly created perfume sharing attributes of an existing one
 Flanker (rugby union), a position in rugby union (not found in rugby league)
 Su-27 Flanker (video game), a 1996 computer game modeling the Sukhoi Su-27
 Sukhoi Su-27 and its derivatives, by NATO reporting name
 Wide receiver, a position in American football

See also
 
 Flank (disambiguation)